Upperglade is an unincorporated community in Webster County, West Virginia, United States. Upperglade has a post office with ZIP code 26266.

References

Unincorporated communities in Webster County, West Virginia
Unincorporated communities in West Virginia